Confluence is a major shopping mall in Lyon, France, opened on 4 April 2012. It is located in the 2nd arrondissement of the city, in the new neighbourhood of Confluence.

Access

Public transportation 
The shopping mall is served by tram lines T1 and T2 at the Hôtel de Région–Montrochet station and by bus S1.

See also 
Musée des Confluences

References

External links
Official website

Buildings and structures in Lyon
Shopping malls established in 2012
Shopping centres in France
Tourist attractions in Lyon
21st-century architecture in France